Los Huracanes del Norte are a Regional Mexican band. Throughout their history, they have played different styles of Norteño music, such as traditional Norteño from northeastern Mexico, rough Norteño from Mexico’s pacific northwest, and saxophone Norteño popular in Mexico’s landlocked states. They are originally from Yahualica de González Gallo, Jalisco and were raised in Tangancícuaro, Michoacán. They are currently based out of Portales, New Mexico, United States. They are one of Regional Mexican music’s most famous acts. 

They first formed under the name Los Cuatro del Norte in 1969 by three brothers and a fourth member; a fourth brother joined in 1972. Their debut record was released in 1973; they scored their first gold record in 1978. With the growth of their success they toured regularly through the United States, Mexico, and Central America. They continued to release charting records from the 2000s to 2020s. Los Huracanes del Norte have released over 900 songs.

On September 7, 2022, Los Huracanes del Norte were honored with the 2,732nd star on the Hollywood Walk of Fame.

Members
Heraclio "Rocky" García - Electric Bass, Vocals
Jesús "Chuy" García - Accordion, Vocals
Guadalupe "Lupillo" García - Saxophone, Accordion, Vocals
Francisco "Pancho" García - Bajo Sexto, Vocals
Antonio H. "El Güero" García - Drums 
Jose Luis "El Chapete" Mejía - Accordion, Vocals 
Roberto Heraclio "Rocky Jr." García - Bajo Sexto, Vocals
Jaime "Jamito" García - Electric Bass

Former members
Raúl "Rury" Rubio - Drums (1969-1979)
Alejandro "Wico" Lopez - Drums (1983-2001)
Asunción Rubalcava - Drums, Percussion (1979-1983)

Other members
Francisco "Panchon" Fellove - Saxophone, Trumpet (Finished In 2005)
Jaime "Jaimito" Garcia - Baritone Saxophone, Electric Bass

Discography
Incomplete discography due to lack of information on lps and later discs
Corrido De Daniel Treviño (1973) (el primer disco de Luna Music)
Tambien Cantan Corridos (1974)
La Gavilla Del Burro Prieto (1975)
Son Tus Perfumenes Mujer (1976)
Ofrenda A Mi Madre (1977)
El Lechero (1978)
El Hijo De La Musiquera (1980)
Los Meros Meros Meros Meros (1982)
Paredes De Mi Casa/Como Un Cobarde (1983)
Los polvos de estos caminos (1983)
Les Cantan A Las Madres (1984) (last album recorded for Luna Music Corporation, a Sony division) (last album with Asunción Rubalcava)
La fortuna de un hijo (1984)
Solo Exitos (1985) (first Garmex Records Sony Music Distribution album) (first album with Alejandro "Wico" Lopez from returning to the group)
15 Super Corridos (1985)
Claveles De Enero (1986)
El Ranchero Chido (1988)
Para Ti (1989)
Los Grandes Corridos (1989)
El Gato Negro (1990)
Como Les Quedo (1991)
Con Nuevos Horizontes (1992)
Cumbias (1993)
Una Explosion Musical (1994) (last Garmex Records album)
Jugada Norteña (1995) (first Fonovisa album)
Corridos Pesados (1995)
Verdades Norteña (1996)
Top Norteño (1997)
Ofrenda a mi madre (1997)
Aires de Mi Norte (1998)
Corridos Pa' Pueblo (1998)
Corridos con fama 1 y 2 (1999)
Norteño 2000 cd 1 y 2 (1999)
En Que Trabaja El Muchacho (2000) U.S. #181
15 Kilates Musicales (2001)
30 Norteñas Perronas (2001)
Borracho, Parrandero y Jugador (2001)
En Vivo (2001) (last album with Alejandro "Wico" Lopez)
Mensaje De Oro (2001) (first album with Antonio H. "El Guero" Garcia & Jose Luis "El Chapete" Mejia)
Pa'l Norte (2002) (last Fonovisa album)
En El Tiempo (2003) (first Univision album)
20 Corridos de Narco (2004)
Con Experiencia y Juventud (2004)
Corridos de Caballos (2004)
Legado Norteño (2004)
Tesoros De Coleccion (2004)
Dejate Querer (2005)
Momentos Inolvidables (2005)
Contra Viento y Marea (2006)
Grandes Corridos de Pelicula (2006)
Nomás no Chillen (2006)
Puro Pa' Arriba (2006) (first album with Roberto Heraclio "Rocky Jr." Garcia)
Vientos Huracanados (2007) (last Univision album)
siempre con su gente (2008)
Mi Complemento (2009) (first Disa album)
En Vivo Desde Monterrey (2010)puras con sax(2010)Corridos que Dejan Huella (2011)Soy Mexicano(2011) (last Disa album)40 Aniversario (2012) (first Universal Music Latino album)Como un Huracán (2012) (first Vene Music album)En Vivo(2013)haciendo historia(2016)Dejate querer (2017)por ser mexicano (2017)
Alma Bohemia (2018)
# (Hashtag) (2018)
Mixes con categoria(2020)
corridos desde el rancho(2020)
Un Siglo Mas(2021)

References

Norteño music groups
American Latin musical groups
Musical groups from San Jose, California
Universal Music Latin Entertainment artists